The Saville reaction is a chemical reaction in which mercury replaces a nitrosyl from a thiol group.

It is used as a method of replacing the nitrosyl from the modified cysteines and thus can serve in research of the redox modification of different proteins.

References

External links
 On use of Saville Reactions on Invitrogen page

Name reactions